The Gilo River is a river in the Gambela Region of southwestern Ethiopia. It is also known by a variety of names: the Gimira of Dizu call it the "Mene", while the Gemira of Chako call it "Owis", and Amhara and Oromo settlers in the early 20th century knew it by a third name, "Bako". From its source in the Ethiopian Highlands near Mizan Teferi it flows to the west, through Lake Tata to join the Pibor River on Ethiopia's border with Sudan. The combined waters then join the Sobat River and the White Nile.

The Gilo River flows mainly through the Baro Salient, a portion of Ethiopia that juts westward into Sudan. The river valley was subjected to a great deal of prospecting for gold before World War II and in the 1950s, but not enough was found to make commercial extraction viable.

Jessen, who was part of W.N. McMillan's expedition that travelled through this part of southwestern Ethiopia in 1904, estimated its length at 200 miles, and noted that at flood the width of the Gilo reaches 80 to 100 yards, with a depth of about 20 feet. Jessen further wrote that at the time of his visit.

See also
List of Ethiopian rivers

References

Gambela Region
Rivers of Ethiopia
Sobat River